Parliamentary elections were held in Ecuador on 4 June 1950.

Results

References

Elections in Ecuador
Ecuador
1950 in Ecuador
June 1950 events in South America
Election and referendum articles with incomplete results